The Sarabhai family  is a prominent Indian family active in several fields. The patriarch, Ambalal Sarabhai, was a leading industrialist. While he created significant wealth, his children interested themselves in a wide variety of other endeavours, and the family is better known for those activities, rather than for industrial enterprise, which is now all but defunct.

Family history
The Sarabhai family are major business family of India belonging to the Shrimal Jain community.

Its twentieth century doyen Sheth Ambalal Sarabhai, was a Jain industrialist. He had five daughters and three sons who were involved in the family business as well as the Indian independence movement. After India's freedom, the family remained involved in developmental tasks undertaken by the government of India.

Ambalal Sarabhai was a prominent mill-owner and also interested in philanthropic activities. His wife Sarladevi Sarabhai was impressed by the Maria Montessori philosophy and in the year 1922, Montessori sent E. M. Standing to India for the homeschooling of Sarabhai children.

Sarabhai Enterprises branched out after India's independence and many pioneer ventures were made in fields dominated by foreign companies. The manufacture of drugs and pharmaceuticals, chemicals and intermediates, dyes and pigments, industrial and household detergents, soaps and cosmetics, industrial packaging and containers, and later engineering and electronic products.

Family members
Prominent members of the Sarabhai family include:
Ambalal Sarabhai. Patriarch of the family. Born into a family of tradesmen, he invested the family wealth into various industrial enterprises in the early 1900s, including Sarabhai Textile Mills at Ahmedabad, which was one of the largest in India at that time.
Anasuya Sarabhai (sister of Ambalal Sarabhai), a trade unionist, activist and freedom fighter. Married young, she never cohabited with her husband.
Saraladevi Sarabhai (wife of Ambalal Sarabhai) and the mother of his eight children (three sons and five daughters)
Suhrid Sarabhai Sr. (son of Ambalal Sarabhai), industrialist
Manorama Sarabhai (wife of Suhrid Sarabhai), commissioned Villa Sarabhai
Anand Sarabhai (son of Suhrid Sr), molecular biologist, partner of Lynda Benglis, American sculptor and visual artist
Suhrid Sarabhai Jr (son of Suhrid Sr), industrialist
Asha Sarabhai, wife of Suhrid Jr, clothing designer
Sanjay Sarabhai (son of Suhrid Jr)
Samir Sarabhai (son of Suhrid Jr)
Gautam Sarabhai (son of Ambalal Sarabhai), industrialist, philanthropist, co founder & the architect of the National Institute of Design, Ahmedabad
Kamalini Sarabhai (wife of Gautam Sarabhai), co founder of B.M. Institute of Mental Health
Mana Sarabhai Brearley (daughter of Gautam Sarabhai)  
Mischa Gorchov Brearley (son of Mana Sarabhai Brearley with artist Robert Gorchov)
Lara Brearley (daughter of Mana Sarabhai Brearley with Mike Brearley)
Shyama Gautam Sarabhai (daughter of Gautam Sarabhai)
Anand Zaveri (husband of Shyama Gautam Sarabhai)
Shaan Zaveri (son of Shyama Gautam Sarabhai), real estate developer in Ahmedabad 
Mridula Sarabhai (daughter of Ambalal Sarabhai), Indian independence activist and politician; unmarried
Vikram Sarabhai (son of Ambalal Sarabhai), co-founder of ISRO and IIM Ahmedabad 
Mrinalini Sarabhai (wife of Vikram Sarabhai), danseuse
Kartikeya Sarabhai (son of Vikram Sarabhai), educationist and environmentalist 
Rajshree Sarabhai (wife of Kartikeya Sarabhai), writer and former director of Rajka Designs, a textile design studio
Samvit Sarabhai (son of Kartikeya Sarbhai), current director of Rajka Designs
Mohal Sarabhai (son of Kartikeya Sarbhai), managing director of Asence Pharma Pvt. Ltd., and Synbiotics Limited (a Sarabhai Family company incorporated in 1960)
Mallika Sarabhai (daughter of Vikram Sarabhai), a danseuse and activist; briefly married to Bipin Shah, a publisher
Revanta Sarabhai (son of Mallika Sarabhai and Bipin Shah), dancer
Anahita Sarabhai (daughter of Mallika Sarabhai), performance artist & co-founder of QueerAbad
Leena Mangaldas (daughter of Ambalal Sarabhai), founder of Shreyas Foundation.
Madanmohan Mangaldas Girdhardas (husband of Leena Mangaldas), noted industrialist
Kamal Mangaldas (son of Leena Mangaldas), noted architect
Arjun Mangaldas (son of Kamal Mangaldas), architect
Leeza Mangaldas (daughter of Arjun Magaldas), popular sex-positive content creator
Abhay Mangaldas (son of Kamal Mangaldas), hotelier, founder of House of MG, a heritage hotel in Ahmedabad
Gira Sarabhai (daughter of Ambalal Sarabhai), co founder of the National Institute of Design, the Calico Museum of Textiles
Gita Mayor (daughter of Ambalal Sarabhai), Indian musician; well known for her patronage in music
Satyadev Mayor, (husband of Gita Mayor)
Pallavi Satyadev Mayor (daughter of Gita Mayor)
Ajay Mayor (son of Pallavi Mayor)
Bharti Sarabhai, (daughter of Ambalal Sarabhai), unmarried

Institutions built by Sarabhai family
 Calico Mills - Ambalal Sarabhai
 Jubilee Mills - Ambalal Sarabhai
 Kasturba Gandhi Rashtriya Smarak Trust - Sarladevi Ambalal Sarabhai
 Majoor Mahajan - Anasuyaben Sarabhai
 Jyoti Sangh - Mridulaben Sarabhai
 Vikas Gruh - Mridulaben Sarabhai
 Shreyas Foundation & School - Leenaben Mangaldas
 B.M. Institute of Mental Health - Gautam Sarabhai
 The Physcotherapy Study Group - Gautam Sarabhai
 National Institute of Design - Gautam Sarabhai and Gira Sarabhai
 Darpana Academy of Performing Arts - Mrinalini & Vikram Sarabhai
 Calico Museum of Textiles - Gira Sarabhai
 Ambalal Sarabhai Enterprises, Baroda - Gautam Sarabhai, a commercial (corporate) venture
 Centre for Environment Education - Kartikeya Sarabhai
 VIKSAT - Kartikeya Sarabhai
 CHETNA - Kartikeya Sarabhai
 Sangeet Kendra - Geeta Mayor
 Darpana for Development - Mallika Sarabhai
 Mapin Publishing - Mallika Sarabhai and her husband Bipin Shah

Major institution building efforts of Vikram Sarabhai (1947-1971)

No.4 was renamed as the Vikram A. Sarabhai Community Science Centre after Dr. Sarabhai’s death in 1971. No.18 & 19 were merged under the Vikram Sarabhai Space Centre after Dr. Sarabhai’s death in 1971. Nos.21,22,23,24,25 and 26 were merged under the Space Applications Centre after Dr. Sarabhai’s death in 1971. No. 31 was renamed as Vikram Earth Station after Dr. Sarabhai’s death in 1971.

See also
Anusyabehn Sarabhai
Jainism
Swaminathan family
Calico Museum of Textiles
Mill Owners' Association Building
National Institute of Design
ISRO
Gira Sarabhai
Gautam Sarabhai
Vikram Sarabhai
Mrinalini Sarabhai

References

External links
Maria Montessory In India

 
Businesspeople from Gujarat
Indian Jains
Jain families
Business families of India